Mathen is a given name of Nasrani origin. It is a variant of the Syriac name which refers to Mathew. It is common in the Indian state of Kerala among the Nasrani (also common among the Syrian Christians). Mathen originated from Matten, a Welsh name. With the same meaning, Matten was spelled by the English as Mathen to fit their grammatical structure and then was transferred to India from the United Kingdom.

Notable people with the name include:
Chalakuzhy Paulose Mathen (1890–1960), Indian banker and politician
Joseph Mathen (1917–1995), Indian politician and Member of Kerala State assembly
Lucy Mathen (born 1953), British-Indian medic and journalist